The 1984 NCAA Division II women's basketball tournament was the third annual tournament hosted by the NCAA to determine the national champion of women's collegiate basketball among its Division II membership in the United States.

Central Missouri State defeated defending champions Virginia Union in the championship game, 80–73, claiming the Jennies' first Division II national title. 

The championship rounds were contested at the Springfield Civic Center in Springfield, Massachusetts, hosted by Springfield College.

Regionals

East

Great Lakes

New England

North Central

South

South Atlantic

South Central

West

National Finals - Springfield, Massachusetts
Visiting team listed first in Elite Eight

Final Four Location: Springfield Civic Center Host: Springfield College

All-tournament team
 Carla Eades, Central Missouri State
 Veta Williams, Virginia Union
 Janice Washington, Valdosta State
 Rosie Jones, Central Missouri State
 Donna Burks, Dayton

See also
 1984 NCAA Division I women's basketball tournament
 1984 NCAA Division III women's basketball tournament
 1984 NCAA Division II men's basketball tournament
 1984 NAIA women's basketball tournament

References
 1984 NCAA Division II women's basketball tournament jonfmorse.com

 
NCAA Division II women's basketball tournament
NCAA Division II women's basketball tournament
NCAA Division II women's basketball tournament